Esther Ellen Freeman (born 1979) is an American physician who is an Assistant Professor of Dermatology at the Harvard Medical School and Director of Global Health Dermatology at Massachusetts General Hospital. Her research considers HIV infection with AIDS-defining malignancies, including Kaposi's sarcoma. During the COVID-19 pandemic Freeman established the American Academy of Dermatology register of COVID-19 skin complaints, through which she identified the novel symptom of COVID toes.

Early life and education 
Freeman attended Milton Academy. As a child she was a competitive skier, and competed in the national championships at the age of twelve. By the age of fifteen Freeman was a member of the United States freestyle skiing team. Freeman earned her undergraduate degree at Dartmouth College. Throughout her college career she skied in World Cup competitions and was a member of the Dartmouth sailing team. During her studies at Dartmouth, Freeman spent time in Kenya and Mexico. In 2002 she was selected as a Marshall Scholar, and moved to the United Kingdom to complete her graduate studies. She was a graduate student at the London School of Hygiene & Tropical Medicine, where she studied HIV dermatology. After completing her doctorate Freeman returned to the United States, where she started a medical degree at Harvard Medical School, and soon after completed her specialist training in dermatology.

Research and career 
In 2011 Freeman began work with the World Health Organization, drafting guidelines on how to treat skin conditions that were associated with HIV in the developing world.  For these efforts she was awarded the 2012 American Academy of Dermatology Members Making a Distance Award.

In 2013 Freeman was appointed Director of Global Health Dermatology at the Massachusetts General Hospital. Here she continued to investigate HIV dermatology, with a particular focus on Kaposi's sarcoma. She serves on the leadership team of the International Alliance of Global Health Dermatology.

Leadership during the COVID-19 pandemic
Freeman is a member of the American Academy of Dermatology task force on coronavirus disease. As part of this effort, she launched and helped to compile a registry of skin complaints of COVID-19 patients. Freeman had expected that coronavirus patients would present with viral rashes. By April 2020 it emerged that around half of the patients who presented with dermatological manifestations of coronavirus disease had so-called "COVID toes". COVID toes are pinkish-reddish lesions that can turn purple as the coronavirus disease progresses (akin to pernio or chilblains), but are distinct from purpura fulminans. They typically last for two to three weeks and can without specific treatment. The physiology behind COVID toes is not understood, but could occur due to inflammation of the toe tissue, inflammation of the blood vessel wall or small blood clots on the inside of the blood vessel. Freeman has shown that even asymptomatic carriers can present with COVID toes, and that most patients in the dermatological register with COVID toe are in their 20s and 30s. She has said that if people have these symptoms have no other cause to have such toes, they should try and get a COVID-19 test. Lindy Fox, a dermatologist in San Francisco, reported that despite it not being the right time of year for chilblains, she was seeing "clinics filled with people coming in with new toe lesions".

Selected publications

References 

1979 births
Living people
American women physicians
Milton Academy alumni
Dartmouth College alumni
Harvard Medical School alumni
Harvard Medical School faculty
Massachusetts General Hospital faculty
American dermatologists
American women academics
21st-century American women